Felipe Ojeda Menocal (born August 30, 1941 in Janitzio, Michoacán) is a Mexican sprint canoeist who competed in the late 1960s and early 1970s.

He was eliminated in the semifinals of the C-1 1000 m event at the 1968 Summer Olympics in Mexico City. Four years later in Munich, Ojeda was eliminated in the semifinals of the C-2 1000 m event.

References
Sports-reference.com profile

1941 births
Canoeists at the 1968 Summer Olympics
Canoeists at the 1972 Summer Olympics
Living people
Mexican male canoeists
Olympic canoeists of Mexico
Sportspeople from Michoacán
People from Pátzcuaro
20th-century Mexican people